Ujunwa Eucharia Okafor (born 20 December 1992) is a Nigerian footballer who plays as a defender. She played for ALG Spor in the Turkish Women's First Football League with jersey number 44. In 2018, she was called up to the Nigeria women's national team.

Playing career

Club
Okafor played in her country in the Nigeria Women Premier League for Delta Queens F.C., before she moved to Turkey, and joined the recently to the Women's First league promoted club ALG Spor in Gaziantep.

International
In February 2018, Okafor was called up to the Nigeria women's national team for their participation at the  2018 WAFU Nations Cup.

Career statistics
.

Honours 
 Turkish Women's First League
 ALG Spor
Runners-up (1): 2018–19

References

1992 births
Living people
Nigerian women's footballers
Women's association football defenders
Nigerian expatriate sportspeople in Turkey
Expatriate women's footballers in Turkey
ALG Spor players
Delta Queens F.C. players